The Gathering Storm is a 1974 British/American television biopic film, about Winston Churchill's life in the years just prior to, and at the start of, World War II, from 1936 to 1940.

It was a joint production of the BBC and NBC, made in 1974 in the Hallmark Hall of Fame; it starred Richard Burton as Churchill and Virginia McKenna as Clementine Churchill. Robin Bailey portrays Neville Chamberlain. The supporting cast includes Ian Bannen as Adolf Hitler, Ian Ogilvy as King Edward VIII, Thorley Walters as Stanley Baldwin and Patrick Stewart as Clement Attlee.

The film has the same title as the first volume of Churchill's largely autobiographical six-volume history of the war. This volume covers the period from 1919 to 10 May 1940, the day he became prime minister.

The film was broadcast on United Kingdom television under the title Walk with Destiny. Although another film about Churchill, made in 2002, was also called The Gathering Storm, it bears little resemblance to the 1974 film.

See also
 The Gathering Storm - 2002 film starring Albert Finney
 Into the Storm – 2009 sequel starring Brendan Gleeson
 Darkest Hour – 2017 film starring Gary Oldman

References
 The Second World War, Volume 1, The Gathering Storm, Winston Churchill, Cassell 1948, (2005 Penguin edition )

External links

1974 television films
1974 films
British television films
BBC television dramas
Films about Winston Churchill
Cultural depictions of Winston Churchill
Cultural depictions of Neville Chamberlain
Hallmark Hall of Fame episodes
Cultural depictions of Adolf Hitler
Cultural depictions of Stanley Baldwin
Films directed by Herbert Wise
American television films
American biographical films
British biographical films
American films based on actual events
British films based on actual events
1970s American films
1970s British films